Gøran Sørheim (born 4 June 1990) is a Norwegian handball player for Drammen HK and the Norwegian national team.

References

1990 births
Living people
Norwegian male handball players
Norwegian expatriate sportspeople in Denmark
Expatriate handball players
SønderjyskE Håndbold players